Siege of Mytilene can refer to one of the following sieges of the town of Mytilene, on the Greek island of Lesbos:

 Siege of Mytilene by the Athenians during the Mytilenean revolt (428–427 BC)
 Siege of Mytilene (333 BC) by the Persians under Memnon of Rhodes during the campaign of Alexander the Great 
 Siege of Mytilene (81 BC), by the Roman Republic
 Siege of Mytilene (1462), by the Ottoman Empire